Sarah Reed (born 1973 in Tucson, Arizona, United States) is an American musician, singer, and guitarist. She is best known as the singer and guitarist for the rock band The Husbands, which she formed and fronted in 2002. The group released two feature-length records on Swami Records and five 7" records. The Husbands toured the United States four times. Their international shows have been in Vancouver, Montreal, Canada, and Tijuana, Mexico. Concurrent with performing in The Husbands, Reed created and led a nine-piece soul-funk cover band, Her Grace The Duchess. They covered artists such as Ike and Tina Turner, Lynn Collins, Betty Davis, and Irma Thomas.

Musical career 
Beginning as a drummer, Sarah Reed formed The Bonnot Gang in Olympia, Washington, with two employees of Kill Rock Stars (Sadie Shaw and Maggie Vail), along with the lead singer of Blood Sausage, Dale Shaw. The Bonnot Gang was named after a French criminal anarchist group. They released one song on a Lookout! / Kill Rock Stars split Slice of Lemon and a 7" record on Decomposition.

Then, in San Francisco, Reed formed a five-piece band called The Lies, which released two full-length records on Kill Rock Stars and toured the U.S. twice.

She was briefly in a band called The Drivers, with Mirah and Molly Burgdorf, which performed only a handful of times and had two songs on Yoyo A Go Go compilations.

Currently Reed is in The Husbands (2002–present) with Sadie Shaw. They performed with multiple drummers, most recently Casey Ward and previously Nikki Sloate, Tina Luchesi, Donny Nuenhausen, John Dwyer, Matt Hartman.

Other activities 
Reed co-directed Charm, a feature-length Super-8 film released in conjunction with the soundtrack by 5RC, a subsidiary of Kill Rock Stars. The soundtrack contained songs by Tim Soete of The Fucking Champs, Sara Lund and Justin Trosper of Unwound, Aaron Beam, Thrones, David Scott Stone, The Aislers Set, The Need

Strongly committed to worker-owned and operated cooperatives, she has worked at and served on boards of directors at both Good Vibrations and Rainbow Grocery Cooperative, both Co-ops located in San Francisco.

External links
Official Web Site
Her Grace The Duchess Myspace Page
 The Husbands Myspace page

Press 
Husbands Village Voice Review
Husbands answers.com review
Charm Review in SF Weekly
Lies Review

1973 births
Living people
21st-century American singers
21st-century American women singers
21st-century American guitarists
21st-century American women guitarists